Issikiopteryx sphaeristis is a moth in the family Lecithoceridae. It is found in southern India.

The wingspan is 16–17 mm. The forewings are ochreous-yellow with a dark fuscous basal median dot and a moderate oblique fuscous fascia from near the costa at one-fourth to the middle of the dorsum, as well as a round fuscous blotch resting on the dorsum before the tornus and reaching four-fifths across the wing. There is also a triangular patch of fuscous suffusion resting on the termen. The hindwings are pale whitish-yellowish, in males with the basal half mostly occupied by a patch of modified brownish scales, including a long expansible pencil of brown hairs from the base in a submedian groove.

References

Moths described in 1908
Issikiopteryx